is the second studio album by the Japanese singer-songwriter Miho Komatsu. It was released on 19 December 1998 by Amemura O-town Record.

Background
The album includes four previously released singles: "Negai Goto Hitotsu Dake", "Chance", "anybody's game" and "Kōri no ue ni Tatsu yō ni" as well as the B-side of the fourth single, "Ichiman Meter no Keshiki".

The single "Kōri no ue ni Tatsu yō ni" received new album instrumentation with no subtitle. Compared to the single, the introduction begins with acoustic guitar. This version of song is the closest to that in the anime television series Detective Conan.

This album includes one self cover song, "Tegotae no Nai Ai", which was originally performed by the Japanese rock band Deen from Being Inc. Later, it was included in two compilation albums by Deen, Deen The Best of Kiseki and DEEN The Best FOREVER Complete Singles+.

This is her only album released on the Amemura label. Her next album, Everywhere, was released by Giza Studio to which she moved in 1999.

Charts
It reached #3 in its first week with 202,290 copies sold. The album charted for 12 weeks and sold 600,900 copies making it her highest selling album.

Track listing
All songs written and composed by Miho Komatsu and arranged by Hirohito Furui (Garnet Crow)

Personnel
Credits adapted from the CD booklet of Miho Komatsu 2nd : Mirai.

Miho Komatsu – vocals, songwriting, composing, producer
Hirohito Furui - arranger
Secil Minami - chorus
Toshiki Haruna - chorus
Takumi Ito - chorus
Yoshinobu Ohga - guitar
Makoto Miyoshi - guitar
Kaori - violin
Taku Oyabu - voice recording
Masayuki Nomura: track engineer
Yoshinori Akai: track engineer, recording engineer
Shuji Yamada: assistant engineer
Gan Kojima – design
Tatsushi Nagae - design
Ryosuke Kimura - design
Be Planning - art direction
Miho Mori - photography
Yukiko Yamawaki - promotion writer
Chiaki Matsuda - label management
Rockaku - producing

Use in media
"anybody's game"
Fuji TV program SF as ending theme
NHK drama series Ojisan Kaizou Kouza as theme song
KBS music program J-rock Artists Best 50 as opening theme
"Ichiman Meter no Keshiki"
Yomiuri TV program Japan International Birdman Rallyas theme song
Shizuoka Asahi Television informational program Sport Paradise as ending theme
CM song for Iwaki Meisei University's radio
"Chance"
Fuji TV's morning breakfast program Mezamashi TV as theme song
"Koori no Ue ni Tatsu you ni"
Anime television series Detective Conan as sixth ending theme
"Mirai"
Kyushu Electric Power as radio CM song
"Tegotae no nai Ai"
PlayStation game L no Kisetsu ~a piece of memories~ as opening theme
"Negai Goto Hitotsu Dake"
Anime television series Detective Conan as fif5th ending theme

References

1998 albums
Miho Komatsu songs
Songs written by Miho Komatsu
1998 songs
Amemura-O-Town Record albums
Albums produced by Daiko Nagato